The Bubba Midden is a historic site near Green Cove Springs, Florida. It is located on Fleming Island, northwest of Green Cove Springs. On March 2, 1990, it was added to the U.S. National Register of Historic Places.

References

External links
 Clay County listings at National Register of Historic Places
 Digging through red tape at Jacksonville Business Journal
 Facebook page

Native American history of Florida
Archaeological sites in Florida
National Register of Historic Places in Clay County, Florida